Reiner Kontressowitz (born 25 June 1942) is a German musicologist and lyricist.

Life 
Kontressowitz was born in Roßlau. After graduating from the Secondary School in 1961, Kontressowitz studied horn, drums, theory and composition at the conservatory in Halle from 1961 to 1963 and at the University of Music and Theatre Leipzig from 1963 to 1967. He completed his studies of musicology at the Martin-Luther-University Halle-Wittenberg from 1971 to 1975 with the diploma thesis: Zur Konzertform bei Tomaso Albinoni.

From 1969 to 1981 he worked as editor, then responsible editor for contemporary music and head of the concert and stage department of the publishing house Edition Peters in Leipzig and from 1981 to 1991 as editor for contemporary music at Breitkopf & Härtel also in Leipzig; there he was responsible for programme conception and organisation of the publishing house's own and external events: such as the publishing house event series "Studio DVfM, Workshop DVfM, Seminar DVfM" and the "Young Composers' Working Group" as well as publishing house concerts in 1982 and 1985 as an encounter in the Gewandhaus. In 1985 in Landestheater Halle, in 1985 in the chamber music hall of the Cottbus Conservatory; in 1987 in the chamber music hall of the Bosehaus; in 1990 in the Alte Handelsbörse in Leipzig. In 1990 he was co-founder of the Forum Zeitgenössischer Musik Leipzig. From 1991 he was lecturer for public relations and from 1999 to 2006 lecturer for practical music (KlA Bühnenwerke) at Bärenreiter-Verlag. Kassel.

Publications 
 Introductory lectures on the Neue Schubert-Ausgabe at master classes in Bad Bertrich, Graz, Lichtenberg, Lübeck, Essen, Dresden, Leipzig, Weikersheim, Rostock, Esslingen, Moers, Marburg, in Switzerland (Luzern among others) and in Czech Republic (Prague).
 Introductory lectures on the Neue Mozart-Ausgabe and to the total edition of Bärenreiter Verlag.
 Radio programmes about contemporary Swedish music and a portrait programme about the composer Claus-Steffen Mahnkopf in MDR Leipzig

Articles in magazines and daily newspapers:
 Neue Formen als Mittler zeitgenössischer Musik, in LVZ v. 18 Nov. 1982
 Concerto con molti compositori contemporanei, in Bulletin des Musikrates der DDR, Berlin 2/1983
 Reinhard Pfundt – Jahrgang 1951 Komponistenporträt, in Musik und Gesellschaft 11/1984
 Victor Bruns, in INFORM, Deutscher Verlag für Musik, Leipzig 1989
 Zeitgenössische Musik für Soloinstrumente, eine Editionsreihe des Deutschen Verlages für Musik Leipzig in Bulletin des Musikrates der DDR, Berlin 1/1990; u. a.

Book publications:
 Spiel-Horizonte with Burkhard Glaetzner about the Gruppe Neue Musik Hanns Eisler 1990
 Fünf Annäherungen zu den Solokonzerten von Friedrich Goldmann, Klaus-Jürgen Kamprad publishing house, 2014

Lyrics:
 lippen über den wolken und an den schweren füßen ketten. Verlag Jürgen Ritschel, 2009
 Erinnerungen - weinend sich betäuben with pictures of the Leipzig painter Gert Pötzschig, Verlag Jürgen Ritschel, 2011
 Wolkenkuckuckshain : Verse aus dem Traumgedächtnis. Verlag Jürgen Ritschel, 2015

Music editions (editor):
TOMMASO ALBINONI, CONCERTI – Verlag Klaus-Jürgen Kamprad, Altenburg
 Opus II / Opera Seconda – i. V. 2020
Concerti a cinque con due Violini, Alto Viola, Tenore Viola, Violoncello e Basso continuo (ca. 1700)
•	 CONCERTI 1 – 6, Sheet music , STIMMEN ISMN 979-0-50258-137-4
 Opus V / Opera V  – i. V. 2019
Concerti a cinque con due /tre Violini, Alto Viola, Tenore Viola, Violoncello e Basso continuo (ca. 1707)
•	Volume 1: Concerti 1 – 6, Sheet music , STIMMEN ISMN 979-0-50258-144-2
•	Volume 2: Concerti 7 – 12, Sheet music , STIMMEN ISMN 979-0-50258-151-0
 Opus VII / Opera Settima – i. V. 2019
XII Concerti a cinque con Violini, Oboi, Violetta, Violoncello e Basso continuo (ca. 1715)
•	Volume 1: Concerti 1 – 6, Sheet music , STIMMEN ISMN 979-0-50258-158-9
•	Volume 2: Concerti 7 – 12, Sheet music , STIMMEN ISMN 979-0-50258-165-7
 Opus IX / Opera Nona – 2018, Verlag Klaus-Jürgen Kamprad
XII Concerti a cinque con Violini, Oboi, Violetta, Violoncello e Basso continuo (ca. 1722)
•	Volume 1: Concerti 1 – 6, Sheet music , STIMMEN ISMN 979-0-50258-172-5
•	Volume 2: Concerti 7 – 12, Sheet music , STIMMEN ISMN 979-0-50258-179-4
 Opus X / Opera Decima – 2018, Verlag Klaus-Jürgen Kamprad
XII Concerti a cinque con Violini, Violetta, Violoncello e Basso continuo (ca. 1736)
•	Volume 1: Concerti 1 – 6, Sheet music , STIMMEN ISMN 979-0-50258-186-2
•	Volume 2: Concerti 7 – 12, Sheet music , STIMMEN ISMN 979-0-50258-193-0

Each Concerto is published as a single score edition, single part editions are also available.

References

External links 
 

20th-century German musicologists
21st-century German musicologists
Literary editors
German lyricists
1942 births
Living people
People from Saxony-Anhalt